Rhododendron molle (羊踯躅) is a rhododendron species native to China and Japan, where it grows at altitudes of sea level to 2500 meters. The flowers are yellow with dark red flecks.

This azalea is not often seen in cultivation, but is the parent of many yellow-flowered hybrids.

References

 "Rhododendron molle", (Blume) G. Don, Gen. Hist. 3: 846. 1834.
 Plants of the World Online

molle